Kevin Buckler (born c. 1959) is an American race car driver and entrepreneur. He founded Adobe Road Winery and currently owns The Racer's Group, a professional sports car racing team; TRG Motorsports, formerly a NASCAR Sprint Cup Series team; and TRG-AMR. In 2019, Kevin launched a $56 racing-themed wine aptly named SHIFT. It comes from Adobe Road, a boutique winery in Sonoma County California.

History
Buckler began racing at the local level in the late 1980s. He attended his first high-speed race in 1990. 
In 1992, Kevin and his wife Debra created The Racer's Group (TRG) as a Porsche Club Racing business that has grown into much more. 1995 saw Buckler take his first start as a professional driver.  He would go on to win that race, beginning a notable career in professional motorsports.  Off the track the same year, Kevin and his wife, along with friends, opened Adobe Road Winery in Sonoma County California. In 2002, TRG with support from Porsche Factory, won the GT class at the Rolex 24 at Daytona and the 24 Hours of Le Mans. Buckler would lead TRG to 3 more GT class wins in the Rolex 24 at Daytona, including an overall 1st place in 2003. TRG holds the record for the team with the most Rolex Sports Car Series GT victories at 29, and is ranked third for the most GT pole positions with 15. In 2009, Buckler would expand his racing horizons into NASCAR with the formation of TRG Motorsports.  TRG Motorsports would go on to take 106 starts in the Sprint Cup Series with 2 top 10 finishes and 6 starts in the Camping World Truck Series, taking 6 starts with 2 top 10 finishes and 1 top 5 finish. In 2012 TRG Motorsports announced it would not continue competing in NASCAR, but would focus on Grand-Am.  As Buckler and TRG continued to make a name for their selves on the track, Kevin and Adobe Road Winery established themselves as a  boutique national brand.  Adobe Road wines have collected many awards, and has 15 wines receiving Wine Spectator scores of 90 and above including the 2008 Cabernet Sauvignon, Napa Valley, Beckstoffer Georges III which received a score of 94 out of 100.

24 Hours of Le Mans results

See also 
 List of celebrities who own wineries and vineyards

References

External links 
The Racer's Group Home Page
TRG Motorsports Home Page
Adobe Road Winery
Kevin Buckler NASCAR Owner Statistics

NASCAR team owners
Racing drivers from California
24 Hours of Le Mans drivers
Rolex Sports Car Series drivers
24 Hours of Daytona drivers
Living people
Year of birth uncertain
Year of birth missing (living people)